Vaccinium whitmorei is a species of plant in the family Ericaceae. It is endemic to Peninsular Malaysia. It is threatened by habitat loss.

References

whitmorei
Endemic flora of Peninsular Malaysia
Endangered plants
Taxonomy articles created by Polbot